Comstock is a lunar impact crater that is located on the far side of the Moon. It lies to the northeast of the walled plain Fersman, and north of the crater Weyl.

This is an eroded crater formation with several small craters lying long the rim. One of these lies attached to the inner side of the rim and inner wall, extending part way across the floor. A cluster of small craters lie across the south-southwest rim and inner wall. The interior floor is marked by several tiny craterlets, and traces of ray material from the crater Ohm to the east-southeast.

Satellite craters
By convention these features are identified on lunar maps by placing the letter on the side of the crater midpoint that is closest to Comstock.

References

 
 
 
 
 
 
 
 
 
 
 
 

Impact craters on the Moon